Chesterton is a surname. Notable people with the surname include:
 Arthur K. Chesterton, British politician, cousin of G. K. Chesterton
 Cecil E. Chesterton, British journalist, brother of G. K. Chesterton
 Frank Chesterton (badminton), English badminton player
 Frank Chesterton (architect) (1877–1916), British architect, cousin of G. K. Chesterton
 George H. Chesterton, English cricketer
 G. K. (Gilbert Keith) Chesterton (1874–1936), British writer and philosopher
 Henry H. Chesterton (c. 1840 – 1883), Victorian plant collector
 Paul Chesterton, English actor

Fictional characters:
 Gil Chesterton, minor character on Frasier
 Ian Chesterton, character in the first series of Doctor Who
 Terrence Chesterton, character in Neighbours

English toponymic surnames